Linwood Historic District can refer to:

United States
Places on the National Register of Historic Places
 Linwood Historic District (Northbridge, Massachusetts), listed on the NRHP in Massachusetts
 Linwood Historic District (Linwood, Maryland), listed on the NRHP in Maryland
 Linwood Historic District (Linwood, New Jersey), listed on the NRHP in New Jersey